John Thomas Jobson (8 August 1900–1983) was an English footballer who played in the Football League for Gateshead, Hartlepools United, Plymouth Argyle, Queens Park Rangers and Stockport County.

References

1900 births
1983 deaths
English footballers
Association football defenders
English Football League players
Washington Colliery F.C. players
Plymouth Argyle F.C. players
Hartlepool United F.C. players
Stockport County F.C. players
Queens Park Rangers F.C. players
Gateshead A.F.C. players